Lyubov Kiryukhina-Tsyoma (born 19 May 1963) is a retired middle-distance runner who represented the Soviet Union and later Russia. She specialized in the 800 metres. She won bronze medals indoors at world and European level in 1987.

She represented her country at the 1996 Summer Olympics, reaching the semi-finals.

She competed at the 1997 World Championships in Athletics but was disqualified for doping. She'd tested positive for the anabolic steroid stanozolol and was subsequently handed a two-year ban from sports.

International competitions

See also
List of doping cases in athletics
List of IAAF World Indoor Championships medalists (women)
List of European Athletics Indoor Championships medalists (women)
800 metres at the World Championships in Athletics
Russia at the World Athletics Championships
Doping at the World Athletics Championships

References

1963 births
Living people
Soviet female middle-distance runners
Russian female middle-distance runners
Olympic female middle-distance runners
Olympic athletes of Russia
Athletes (track and field) at the 1996 Summer Olympics
World Athletics Championships athletes for Russia
World Athletics Indoor Championships medalists
Russian Athletics Championships winners
Doping cases in athletics
Russian sportspeople in doping cases